Daniel Alejandro Rivillo Godoy (born 21 December 1996) is a Venezuelan footballer who plays as a defender for Aragua in the Venezuelan Primera División.

Honors

Club
Zulia
Copa Venezuela: 2016, 2018

References

External links
Profile at ESPN FC

1996 births
Living people
Atlético Venezuela C.F. players
Zulia F.C. players
Aragua FC players
Venezuelan Primera División players
Venezuelan footballers
Association football defenders
Footballers from Caracas
21st-century Venezuelan people